Fakhruddin Ali Ahmed Medical College and Hospital (FAAMCH) is the fifth medical college of Assam based in Barpeta. The college has been named after former President of India Fakhruddin Ali Ahmed. The classes were formally inaugurated in August 2012 by then health minister of Assam, Himanta Biswa Sarma, after it received the permission from the Medical Council of India even though the hospital section was inaugurated on 11 February 2011.

It is affiliated with Srimanta Sankaradeva University of Health Sciences, Guwahati. The college has a current intake of 125 undergraduate students per year and 42 postgraduate students per year. The college also runs various paramedical diploma courses.

Departments

Anaesthesiology
Anatomy
Biochemistry
Community Medicine
Dentistry
Dermatology
 ENT
Forensic Medicine
Medicine
Microbiology
Obstetrics & Gynaecology
Ophthalmology
Orthopaedics
Paediatrics
Pathology
Pharmacology
Physiology
Psychiatry
Radiology
Surgery
 TB &  Chest

XCLEPIA
Xclepia is the annual fest of F. A. A. Medical College. It is held every year towards the end of first week of February and ends on 11 Feb which commemorates the Foundation Day of the college.
Various sports, literary, cultural activities etc. are undertaken during the fest week by the students, staff and teachers of the college.
Xclepia is named after Asclepius or Hepius,a hero and GOD of medicine in ancient Greek religion and mythology.

References

External links
 

Affiliates of Srimanta Sankaradeva University of Health Sciences
Medical colleges in Assam
Barpeta district
2011 establishments in Assam
Educational institutions established in 2011